Gunhtang Gam Shawng is a Kachin political and military leader. He is the vice chairman of the Kachin Independence Organisation (KIO) and the commander in chief of the Kachin Independence Army. Shawng was also previously the chief of staff of the KIO.

References 

Burmese military personnel
Burmese rebels
Living people
Burmese people of Kachin descent
Year of birth missing (living people)
Date of birth missing (living people)
Place of birth missing (living people)